Geoffrey I (c. 980 – 20 November 1008), also known as Geoffrey of Rennes and Geoffrey Berengar, was the eldest son of Duke Conan I of Brittany. He was Count of Rennes (ruler of the Romano-Frankish civitas of Rennes), by right of succession. In 992 he assumed the title of Duke of Brittany, which had long been an independent state, but he had little control over much of Lower Brittany.

Life
Geoffrey was the son of Duke Conan I, by his marriage to Ermengarde-Gerberga of Anjou. He was the grandson of Judicael Berengar, Count of Rennes.

When Geoffrey succeeded to Brittany he had several problems: 

Blois was encroaching on his territory, 

Vikings were threatening his shores, and

He had to decide whether to accept the protection offered by Anjou.

Norman alliance
In 996, at about the age of sixteen, Geoffrey entered into a dynastic alliance with Richard II, Duke of Normandy, with a diplomatic double marriage between the two houses. The church-sanctioned marriage ceremonies were held at Mont Saint-Michel, on the Breton-Norman border, and while Geoffrey married Hawise of Normandy, daughter of Richard I of Normandy and sister of Richard II, Richard married Judith of Brittany, Geoffrey's sister.

Geoffrey and Hawise had four children:

 Alan III of Brittany (997-1040)
 Evenus (born c. 998, died after 1037)
 Odo, Count of Penthièvre (died 1079)
 Adela, Abbess of Saint-Georges

Death
Geoffrey died on 20 November 1008 while travelling on a pilgrimage to Rome.

Notes

References

See also
Dukes of Brittany family tree

980s births
1008 deaths
10th-century dukes of Brittany
11th-century dukes of Brittany
Counts of Rennes
Dukes of Brittany